Slotten Church is a parish church of the Church of Norway in Måsøy Municipality in Troms og Finnmark county, Norway. It is located in the village of Slåtten on the mainland part of the island municipality. It is one of the churches for the Måsøy parish which is part of the Hammerfest prosti (deanery) in the Diocese of Nord-Hålogaland. The white, wooden church was built in a long church style in 1963 using plans drawn up by the architect Rolf Harlew Jenssen. The church seats about 100 people.

History
The first church in Slåtten was built in 1896 when an older church (from 1763) from Kvalsund was moved to Slåtten and rebuilt. That church was used in Slåtten until 1944 when the retreating German army burned it to the ground. The church was rebuilt after the war. The new building was consecrated in 1965.

Media gallery

See also
List of churches in Nord-Hålogaland

References

Måsøy
Churches in Finnmark
Wooden churches in Norway
20th-century Church of Norway church buildings
Churches completed in 1963
1896 establishments in Norway
Long churches in Norway